Simone Emmanuello (born 25 April 1994) is an Italian footballer who plays as a midfielder  for  club Pro Vercelli.

Career

Juventus
Emmanuello was a youth product of Juventus. He was an overage player for the under-19 youth team in the first half of 2013–14 season.

Atalanta
On 31 January 2014 Juventus swapped half of the registration rights of Emmanuello (for €1.5 million price tag) with the 50% rights of Davide Cais (for €1.54 million), The deals made Juventus register a profit of about €1.5 million in the 2013–14 season (a potential profit of €1.5 million would be registered in the future season) and about €3.1 million in Atlanta's 2014 financial year (a potential loss of €1.54 million would be registered in the future season), despite the increase was in terms of intangible assets. Emmanuello immediately left for Pro Vercelli.

On 24 June 2015 Atlanta bought Emmanuello outright for another €800,000, with Cais moved to Juventus also for €800,000.

Pro Vercelli (loan)
On 31 January 2014 Emmanuello was signed by Piedmontese club Pro Vercelli in a temporary deal, re-joining Juventus team-mate Giuseppe Ruggiero.

Pro Vercelli won promotion back to Serie B in 2014. In June 2014 the loan and co-ownership were renewed. Emmanuello remained in Pro Vercelli for 2014–15 season. In June 2015 Emmanuello joined Atalanta outright. He remained in Vercelli again for 2015–16 season, as no.14 of the first team.

Perugia & Cesena (loan)
On 25 July 2017, he joined Serie B club Perugia on loan.

For the next season, on 11 January 2018, he was loaned Serie B club Cesena.

Juventus second spell
In August 2018 Emmanuello was re-signed by his mother club Juventus, however, for their B team Juventus Under 23 only. Emmanuello made his league debut against Alessandria on 16 September. As Juventus B also used Stadio Giuseppe Moccagatta as their home stadium, the match was also a local derby.

Return to Pro Vercelli
On 31 January 2019, his rights were sold by Juventus to Pro Vercelli as part of Erik Gerbi's deal.

Loan to Vicenza
On 11 July 2019, he joined Vicenza on loan. On 31 January 2020, the loan was terminated by Pro Vercelli.

References

External links
 Profile at Italian Football Federation 
 Profile at Lega Serie B 
 

1994 births
Living people
People from Chieri
Footballers from Piedmont
Italian footballers
Association football midfielders
Serie B players
Serie C players
Atalanta B.C. players
F.C. Pro Vercelli 1892 players
A.C. Perugia Calcio players
A.C. Cesena players
Juventus Next Gen players
L.R. Vicenza players
Italy youth international footballers
Sportspeople from the Metropolitan City of Turin